Dobrin is both a surname and a given name. Notable people with the name include:

Surname:
Neta Dobrin (born 1975), Israeli politician
Nicolae Dobrin, Romanian footballer
Sergei Dobrin, Russian figure skater
Tory Dobrin, the artistic director

Given name:
Dobrin Orlovski (born 1981), Bulgarian football defender